The 20 Hunchakian gallows (also "The 20 Martyrs" and "The 20s") is the common name for the group of Hunchakian activists who were hanged in the Sultan Beyazıt Square of Constantinople (now Istanbul) on June 15, 1915, during the Armenian genocide.

History
The 7th General Convention of the Social Democrat Hunchakian Party which was held in Constanţa, Romania, in 1913, had a unique and great importance not only for the Hunchaks, but in the history of the Armenian people as a whole. During the convention, members stressed their concern of the Ittihad (Young Turk) government's blatant disregard of the Armenian lives who resided in Historic Armenia. The Hunchaks feared that this disregard would only escalate as time passed. The Hunchaks also stressed the importance of a United Independent Armenia which would be impossible under the racist and dictatorial Young Turk government's rule of the Ottoman Empire.

Thus the convention adjourned with two main objectives:

I - As stated in its original program, the party was to move from licit to illicit activities, thus becoming once again a covert organization.

II - To plan and assassinate the leaders of the Ittihad (Young Turk) party, the same leaders that carried out the Adana massacres of 1909, and thus the same leaders who at that moment were planning the annihilation of the Armenian people.

However, these secret objectives were passed on to the Ottomans by an agent; consequently as soon as the delegates arrived in Constantinople, they were arrested. By the end of the year a total of one hundred and forty Hunchak leaders were arrested.

After spending two years in terrible conditions in Ottoman prisons, and undergoing lengthy mock trials, twenty prominent figures - Paramaz, Dr. Benne, Aram Achekbashian, Vanig and others were sentenced to death by hanging. A few weeks after the beginning of the Armenian genocide on June 15, 1915, all twenty men were hanged in the central square of Constantinople, known as Sultan Bayazid Square. Paramaz's last words before his hanging were, "You can only hang our bodies, but not our ideology. ...You will see tomorrow on the Eastern horizon a Socialist Armenia."

List of the hanged Hunchakians
The names are written according to the writer and publisher Teotig. Two other prominent Hunchakian activists, Stepan Sapah-Gulian and Varaztahd, were condemned to death in absentia.

 Paramaz - Փարամազ
 Dr. Benne (Bedros Torosian) - Տքթ. Պէննէ (Պետոս Թորոսեան), from Kharpert)
 Aram Achekbashian - Արամ Աչըգպաշեան - (Krikor Garabedian, from Arabkir)
 Kegham Vanigian - Գեղամ Վանիկեան, (from Van), one of the editors of Gaidz youth journal
 Mourad Zakarian - Մուրատ Զաքարեան, (from Mush)
 Yervant Topouzian - Երուանդ Թօփուզեան
 Hagop Basmajian - Յակոբ Պասմաճեան
 Smpat Kelejian - Սմբատ Գըլըճեան
 Roupen Garabedian - Ռուբէն Կարապետեան
 Armenag Hampartsoumian - Արմենակ Համբարձումեան
 Apraham Mouradian - Աբրահամ Մուրատեան
 Hrand Yegavian - Հրանդ Եկաւեան
 Karnig Krikor Boyajian - Գառնիկ Գրիգոր Պօյաճեան (from Shabin-Karahisar Şebinkarahisar)
 Hovhannes D. Ghazarian - Յովհաննէս Տ. Ղազարեան
 Mgrdich Yeretsian - Մկրտիչ Երէցեան
 Yeremia Manoukian - Երեմիա Մանուկեան
 Tovmas Tovmasian - Թովմաս Թովմասեան
 Karekin Boghosian - Գարեգին Պօղոսեան
 Minas Keshishian - Մինաս Քէշիշեան
 Boghos Boghosian - Պողոս Պողոսեան

Commemoration
Since their execution, the Twenty Martyrs have been a source of inspiration for thousands of young Armenians throughout the world, most especially to those who joined the Social Democrat Hunchakian Party and fought under its banner.

In 2001 the monument of Paramaz and his 19 Hunchakian comrades was opened in Meghri, Armenia.

On June 15, 2010, a panel discussion was held in Yerevan and the hanged activists were commemorated at the Tsitsernakaberd genocide memorial.

On June 13, 2013, a panel discussion was held in Istanbul with the attendance of human rights organizations and Turkish intellectuals.

References

External links
 The Twenty Hunchakian Gallows
 www.norserount.ca  Nor Serount Canadian branch

People who died in the Armenian genocide
Deaths by hanging
Social Democrat Hunchakian Party